Mohammed Alfar (born 3 March 1998) is a Sri Lankan cricketer. He made his Twenty20 debut for Sri Lanka Navy Sports Club in the 2017–18 SLC Twenty20 Tournament on 24 February 2018. He made his List A debut for Sri Lanka Navy Sports Club in the 2017–18 Premier Limited Overs Tournament on 12 March 2018.

References

External links
 

1998 births
Living people
Sri Lankan cricketers
Sri Lanka Navy Sports Club cricketers